Steffi Graf and Gabriela Sabatini were the defending champions but lost in the quarterfinals to Nicole Provis and Elna Reinach.

Jana Novotná and Helena Suková defeated Larisa Savchenko and Natasha Zvereva in the final, 6–1, 6–2 to win the ladies' doubles tennis title at the 1989 Wimbledon Championships.

Seeds

  Martina Navratilova /  Pam Shriver (semifinals)
  Larisa Savchenko /  Natasha Zvereva (final)
  Jana Novotná /  Helena Suková (champions)
  Patty Fendick /  Jill Hetherington (third round)
  Steffi Graf /  Gabriela Sabatini (quarterfinals)
  Gigi Fernández /  Lori McNeil (quarterfinals)
  Katrina Adams /  Zina Garrison (quarterfinals)
  Elizabeth Smylie /  Wendy Turnbull (third round)
  Elise Burgin /  Rosalyn Fairbank (third round)
  Isabelle Demongeot /  Nathalie Tauziat (first round)
 n/a
  Manon Bollegraf /  Eva Pfaff (third round)
  Jenny Byrne /  Robin White (third round)
  Brenda Schultz /  Andrea Temesvári (quarterfinals)
  Tine Scheuer-Larsen /  Catherine Tanvier (first round)
  Chris Evert /  Hana Mandlíková (quarterfinals)

Qualifying

Draw

Finals

Top half

Section 1

Section 2

Bottom half

Section 3

Section 4

References

External links

1989 Wimbledon Championships – Women's draws and results at the International Tennis Federation

Women's Doubles
Wimbledon Championship by year – Women's doubles
Wimbledon Championships
Wimbledon Championships